"Reminder" is a song recorded by Canadian singer the Weeknd from his third studio album, Starboy (2016). It was written by him with Dylan Wiggins, DaHeala, and its producers Doc McKinney, Mano and Cirkut. The song was released to rhythmic contemporary radio on May 9, 2017, as the album's fourth single in the United States.

The official remix was released on August 1, 2017, and features new verses from American rappers ASAP Rocky and Young Thug. It was later included on the deluxe version of Starboy, released on March 14, 2023.

Commercial performance
"Reminder" peaked at number 31 on the US Billboard Hot 100. It reached the top ten on both the R&B Songs chart and Hot R&B/Hip-Hop Songs chart. The song also charted and peaked at number 16 on the Canadian Hot 100, reaching the top 20. The single was certified 3× Platinum by the Recording Industry Association of America (RIAA) for combined sales and streaming equivalent units of over three million units in the United States. In 2023, the song saw an increase in consumption as it went viral on the social media platform Tiktok, which led led to the song charting at 140 on the Billboard Global 200.

Music video
The music video for "Reminder", directed by Kid Studio, premiered via the Weeknd's Vevo channel on February 16, 2017. It features cameo appearances from Drake, ASAP Rocky, Travis Scott, Bryson Tiller, YG, French Montana, Metro Boomin, Belly, Nav, Derek Wise, and the Weeknd's co-manager Amir "Cash" Esmailian. As of March 2023, the video has accumulated 385 million views. The video received four nominations at the 2017 MTV Video Music Awards; Video of the Year, Best Direction, Best Art Direction and Best Editing.

Remix 
The A$AP Rocky and Young Thug remix of the song featuring their new verses, was released on August 1, 2017, five days after its announcement, where singer the Weeknd posted two Instagram videos previewing both of their verses. Ryan Reed of Rolling Stone wrote, "A$AP Rocky’s winding verse touches on marijuana and Jaden Smith ('Just like Jaden Smith, I’ll probably walk around a day with it.') and referenced the Weeknd’s Abel Tesfaye ('No way you think if I ever decide to cut my hair like Abel') strolling around with his recently clipped dreadlocks at the 2017 Met Gala," and noted, "In his Auto-Tuned verse, Young Thug moves from referencing his humble beginnings ('I used to pray to hear my songs on the radio') to a series of financial and sexual boasts". It was later included on the deluxe version of the album, released on March 14, 2023.

Track listing

Charts

Weekly charts

Year-end charts

Certifications

Release history

References

External links
 

2016 songs
2017 singles
The Weeknd songs
Songs written by the Weeknd
Songs written by Cirkut (record producer)
Song recordings produced by Cirkut (record producer)
Songs written by DaHeala
Songs written by Doc McKinney
Songs written by Dylan Wiggins
Republic Records singles
XO (record label) singles
Compositions in G minor